Championship Golf is video game published in 1982 by Hayden Software for the Atari 8-bit family and Apple II. A Commodore 64 version followed in 1983.

Gameplay
Championship Golf is a golf game which presents the course using both an overhead view and a side view.

Reception
Stanley Greenlaw reviewed the game for Computer Gaming World, and stated that "The side view adds a degree of interest as you watch your ball fly into the air, down the fairway, and bounce to its stopping point. Unfortunately the game does not capitalize on this feature."

References

External links
1984 Software Encyclopedia from Electronic Games

1982 video games
Apple II games
Atari 8-bit family games
Commodore 64 games
Golf video games
Video games developed in the United States